Medco can refer to:
Medco Health Solutions, a U.S. pharmacy benefits management company
Medco Energi Internasional, an Indonesian energy company
Medco Energi Mining Internasional (MEMI), a subsidiary of Medco Energi Internasional